The London Metal Exchange (LME) is a futures and forwards exchange with the world's largest market in standarised forward contracts, futures contracts and options on base metals. The exchange also offers contracts on ferrous metals and precious metals. The company also allows for cash trading. It offers hedging, worldwide reference pricing, and the option of physical delivery to settle contracts.

Overview

Ring trading
Trading Times are 11:40 to 17:00 GMT.

The LME is the last exchange in Europe where open-outcry trading takes place. The ring was temporarily closed in March 2020 due to the COVID-19 pandemic. In January 2021, LME proposed closing the ring, Europe’s last open-outcry trading floor, and moving permanently to an electronic system.

In addition to the 9 companies that have exclusive rights to trade in the Ring, around 100 companies are involved in the LME in total.

Precious metals
The LME used, however, to provide trade matching and clearing services to the London bullion market and distributes gold, silver, and gold IRS (interest rate swaps) forward rates on behalf of the LBMA.

Electronic trading
The LME launched an electronic platform called LME Select launched in February 2001. This was developed by a Swedish software house Cinnober. The platform is a FIX-based trading platform, and now handles a majority of the total LME business.

Controversies

Lawsuits
In March of 2022, LME was sued by Elliot Management, an American hedge fund. The hedge fund sued for $456 million, claiming that LME acted "unreasonably and irrationally" when it canceled nickel trades made on March 8, 2022. Jane Street Global Trading also sued LME for $15.3 million over its cancelled nickel trades in March. Both lawsuits were filed in the English High Court.

See also
List of futures exchanges
London Platinum and Palladium Market

References

External links
London Metal Exchange

Financial services companies established in 1877
Commodity exchanges in the United Kingdom
Organisations based in the City of London
Buildings and structures in the City of London
Futures exchanges
1877 establishments in the United Kingdom
Organizations established in 1877
Metal industry
2012 mergers and acquisitions